Parapsectris feraxoides is a moth in the family Gelechiidae. It was described by Oleksiy V. Bidzilya in 2010. It is found in South Africa.

References

Endemic moths of South Africa
Parapsectris
Moths described in 2010